Jordon Butts (born 31 December 1999) is an Australian rules footballer who plays for the Adelaide Football Club in the Australian Football League (AFL). He was recruited by the Adelaide Football Club with the 39th draft pick in the 2019 rookie draft. He is the son of former  player Gerard Butts.

Early football
Butts played for the Shepparton Football Club in the Goulburn Valley Football Netball League, where he played 3 games, one of them a premiership victory. He also played 2 games for the Werribee Football Club. Butts played 40 games for the Murray Bushrangers in the NAB League over 3 seasons spanning from 2016 to 2018. He kicked 25 goals during his time with the Bushrangers while playing a variety of positions. He came runner up in the club's best and fairest in the 2017 season. In 2017, Butts was selected to represent Vic Country at the AFL Under 18 Championships.

AFL career
On debut, Butts picked up 8 disposals, 3 marks and a tackle. In only his third game of AFL, Butts was given the job against forward Tom Hawkins, the reigning Coleman Medalist. He managed to take 10 disposals, and kept Hawkins to two goals.

Statistics
Statistics are correct to round 6 of the 2021 season

|- style="background:#EAEAEA"
| scope="row" text-align:center | 2020
| 
| 41 || 2 || 0 || 0 || 8 || 6 || 14 || 5 || 2 || 0.0 || 0.0 || 4.0 || 3.0 || 7.0 || 2.5 || 1.0
|-
|-
| scope="row" text-align:center | 2021
| 
| 41 || 6 || 0 || 0 || 42 || 23 || 65 || 25 || 5 || 0.0 || 0.0 || 7.0 || 3.8 || 10.8 || 4.2 || 0.8
|- style="background:#EAEAEA; font-weight:bold; width:2em"
| scope="row" text-align:center class="sortbottom" colspan=3 | Career
| 8
| 0
| 0
| 50
| 29
| 79
| 30
| 7
| 0.0
| 0.0
| 6.3
| 3.6
| 9.9
| 3.8
| 0.9
|}

References

External links

1999 births
Living people
Adelaide Football Club players
Australian rules footballers from Victoria (Australia)
Shepparton Football Club players
Murray Bushrangers players